The Electoral (Amendment) (No. 2) Act 1998 (No. 19) was a law of Ireland which revised Dáil constituencies in light of the 1996 census. It took effect on the dissolution of the 28th Dáil on 25 April 2002 and a general election for the 29th Dáil on the revised constituencies took place on 17 May 2002.

In September 1997, the Minister for the Environment and Local Government established an independent Constituency Commission under terms of the Electoral Act 1997. This was the first commission established on a statutory basis, with its terms of reference defined in the legislation. The commission was chaired by Richard Johnson, judge of the High Court, and delivered its report in March 1998. The Act implemented the recommendations of the report and repealed the Electoral (Amendment) Act 1995, which had defined constituencies since the 1997 general election.

It was repealed by the Electoral (Amendment) Act 2005, which created a new schedule of constituencies first used at the 2007 general election for the 30th Dáil held on 24 May 2007.



Constituencies for the 29th Dáil
Explanation of columns
 Created: The year of the election when a constituency of the same name was last created.
 Seats: The number of TDs elected from the constituency under the Act.
 Change: Change in the number of seats since the last distribution of seats (which took effect in 1997).

Summary of changes
This list summarises changes in representation. It does not address revisions to the boundaries of constituencies.

References

Electoral 1998
1998 in Irish law
Acts of the Oireachtas of the 1990s